Mustafa Kamal, Mostafa Kamal or variations may refer to:

Mustafa Kemal Atatürk (1881–1938), Turkish field marshal, revolutionary statesman, and founder of the Republic of Turkey as well as its first President.
Mustafa Kemal Kurdaş (1920–2011), Turkish economist and politician
Mustafa Kamal Mahmoud (1921–2009), Egyptian doctor, philosopher, and author
Mostafa Kamal Tolba (1922–2016), Egyptian scientist
Mustafa Kamal (judge) (1933–2015), Chief Justice of Bangladesh
Abu Hena Mustafa Kamal (1936–1989), professor of Bengali literature
Mostafa Kamal (Bir Sreshtho) (1947–1971), Bangladeshi military hero
Mustafa Kamal (politician) (born 1947), Bangladeshi politician and businessman
Mostafa Kamal Pasha (born 1950), Bangladeshi politician
Lotfi Mustafa Kamal (born 1952), Egyptian airman and politician
Mostafa Hussein Kamel (born 1960), Egyptian Minister of State for Environmental Affairs
AKM Mustafa Kamal Pasha (born 1963), Major General of Bangladesh Army
Syed Mustafa Kamal (born 1971), Pakistani politician and former mayor of Karachi
Mostafa Kamal (footballer) (born 1973), Egyptian footballer
Mustapha Kamal N'Daw (born 1981), Gambian footballer
Sheikh Mustafa Kamal, Indian politician